Filimone "Fili" Lolohea (born 31 January 1979) is a New Zealand former professional rugby league footballer who played in the 1990s and 2000s.

Background
Lolohea was born in Auckland, New Zealand, he has Tongan ancestors, and eligible to play for Tonga due to the grandparent rule.

Playing career
Lolohea was an Ellerslie Eagles junior, and joined the new Auckland Warriors franchise in 1995. In 1997 he was part of the Warriors Under-19s team that lost the grand final.

In 1999 Lolohea played for Tonga in the one off test match against New Zealand. He was subsequently picked for the 2000 Rugby League World Cup.

In 2002 Lolohea joined the South Sydney Rabbitohs when they returned to the National Rugby League. He played in nine first grade games for the club over three seasons.

Lolohea then moved to England, joining the London Broncos/Harlequins RL. He played in 32 matches over two seasons for the London side before retiring.

References

External links
Statistics at rleague.com
Statistics at slstats.org

1979 births
Ellerslie Eagles players
Living people
London Broncos players
New Zealand sportspeople of Tongan descent
New Zealand rugby league players
Rugby league players from Auckland
Rugby league props
Rugby league locks
South Sydney Rabbitohs players
Tonga national rugby league team players